Shantaram Laxman Naik (12 April 1946 – 9 June 2018) was an Indian politician from Indian National Congress party and a former Member of the Parliament of India representing Goa in the Rajya Sabha, the upper house of the Indian Parliament. He was the President of the Goa Pradesh Congress Committee  and the whip of the Indian National Congress in the Rajya Sabha.

Early life and personal background
Shantaram Naik was born on 12 April 1946 to Laxman and Sita Naik in Cuncolim village in then Portuguese India. He was initiated into politics as a student during the 1967 Assembly elections when he started putting up election campaign posters of the Indian National Congress in public places. He pursued a B.A.  degree from the Parvatibai Chowgule College (then affiliated to the University of Mumbai and obtained a LL.B. degree from the Siddharth College of Law in Mumbai. Naik's participation in active politics started in 1972 and he started his law practice the same year. He was an agriculturist and lawyer by profession. He has served as a Special Public Prosecutor. Naik has also been the General Secretary of the Goa, Daman and Diu Pradesh Congress Committee.

He has served as a member of the Town and Country Planning Board, Goa; Committee on Personal Laws, Goa; Tenancy Committee, Goa and the State Khadi Board, Goa. He was elected the President of the South Goa Advocates' Association and the Vice President of the Goa, Daman and Diu Advocates' Association.

He married Beena Naik (née Nikam) on 11 May 1984. Beena is the sister of eminent public prosecutor Ujjwal Nikam. Shantaram and Beena have a son named Archit.

Member of Lok Sabha
Shantaram Naik was elected to the 8th Lok Sabha in the 1984 general election from the North Goa constituency. As a Lok Sabha member, he introduced the highest number of Private member's bills in the 8th Lok Sabha. He also pursued the demand for statehood to Goa. During his term at the 8th Lok Sabha, Naik was a member of the Estimates Committee.

Member of Rajya Sabha
Naik represented Goa in the Rajya Sabha for two terms.

Death 
He died on 9 June 2018 in Margao, Goa following a heart attack.

Controversy 
After a Russian woman claimed she was raped by a state politician, he suggested that some rape victims invite trouble by socialising with "strangers" and blamed the media for highlighting the issue. Naik was criticised by leaders of opposition parties such as CPI-M, BJP and SP for blaming the rape victim and media.

References

External links
 Official Website of Shantaram Naikji - Exploring his work done - launched by his family
 Profile on Rajya Sabha website

1946 births
2018 deaths
Indian National Congress politicians from Goa
Rajya Sabha members from Goa
People from South Goa district
Lok Sabha members from Goa
India MPs 1984–1989